Ashbrittle is a village and civil parish in Somerset, England, situated nine miles west of Taunton and close to the River Tone and the route of the Grand Western Canal in the Somerset West and Taunton district.  The village has a population of 225.

History

The parish of Ashbrittle was part of the Milverton Hundred.

A 3000– 4,000 year old Yew tree (Taxus baccata) in the village was among the Great British Trees list that included 50 trees selected by the Tree Council in 2002 to spotlight trees in Great Britain in honour of the Queen's Golden Jubilee. The tree is growing on the top of a Bronze Age Bowl barrow.

Court Place Farmhouse was built in the late 15th century and has undergone several renovations and extensions since. It is a Grade II listed building.

The film Luna de Miel received its first UK showing in its restored form, in the village, after restoration by Charles Doble, on 21 June 2003.

The novels Two Cows And A Vanful Of Smoke and Isabel's Skin by Peter Benson, who lived in Ashbrittle during the 1970s, are set in the village and its surrounding area.

Governance

The parish council has responsibility for local issues, including setting an annual precept (local rate) to cover the council’s operating costs and producing annual accounts for public scrutiny. The parish council evaluates local planning applications and works with the local police, district council officers, and neighbourhood watch groups on matters of crime, security, and traffic. The parish council's role also includes initiating projects for the maintenance and repair of parish facilities, as well as consulting with the district council on the maintenance, repair, and improvement of highways, drainage, footpaths, public transport, and street cleaning. Conservation matters (including trees and listed buildings) and environmental issues are also the responsibility of the council.

The village falls within the non-metropolitan district of Somerset West and Taunton, which was established on 1 April 2019. It was previously in the district of Taunton Deane, which was formed on 1 April 1974 under the Local Government Act 1972, and part of Wellington Rural District before that. The district council is responsible for local planning and building control, local roads, council housing, environmental health, markets and fairs, refuse collection and recycling, cemeteries and crematoria, leisure services, parks, and tourism.

Somerset County Council is responsible for running the largest and most expensive local services such as education, social services, libraries, main roads, public transport, policing and  fire services, trading standards, waste disposal and strategic planning.

It is also part of the Taunton Deane county constituency represented in the House of Commons of the Parliament of the United Kingdom. It elects one Member of Parliament (MP) by the first past the post system of election, and was part of the South West England constituency of the European Parliament prior to Britain leaving the European Union in January 2020, which elected seven MEPs using the d'Hondt method of party-list proportional representation.

Religious sites

The Church of St John the Baptist dates from the 15th century and has been designated as a grade II* listed building.

References

External links

 

Villages in Taunton Deane
Civil parishes in Somerset
Grand Western Canal